Matt James (born 26 March 1987) is a retired Wales international rugby league. He played in the Super League for Harlequins RL and the Bradford Bulls, and in the Co-operative Championship for the Barrow Raiders, Featherstone Rovers and Sheffield Eagles.

Background
James was born in Wakefield, West Yorkshire, England.

Early career
James made great progress after joining Bradford from Eastmoor on the advice of Brian McDermott. He represented the Senior side in his first two seasons whilst still eligible for the Junior Academy. James has played for both England and Yorkshire in his junior career.

Bradford Bulls
James played for Bradford Bulls for three years, between 2006 and 2009.

It was announced in September 2008 that James would be loaned to Halifax for the 2009 season, but returned to Bradford early in February 2009 having played just ten games for 'Fax'.

Harlequins RL
James signed for the London club in 2010, but failed to settle in the capital and was released from his contract after just three games. In March of the same he had his contract with Harlequins RL cancelled by mutual consent after an ineffective spell at the club.

Barrow Raiders
After leaving 'Quins' he moved to the Barrow Raiders, spending two seasons with the Cumbrian club. In this spell he played a total of 32 game sin which he scored 7 tries.

Wakefield Trinity Wildcats
James returned to the Super League to sign for the Wakefield Trinity Wildcats in 2012. However, the return did not pan out well, as after playing 5 games at the top the level he was loaned to Halifax for a second time. This time James only made one appearance in his loan spell in a 36-6 victory over the Dewsbury Rams. All six games he played in for both sides were substitute appearances.

Featherstone Rovers
In November 2012, James left the Wakefield Trinity Wildcats and signed a two-year contract with the Featherstone Rovers. He finally found a long-term team again and played a total of 75 games for the Featherstone Rovers, he scored 16 tries during the course of these games.

Sheffield Eagles
He commenced playing for the Sheffield Eagles in 2016. In his second season with the Eagles, James was announced to be the 2017 season captain for the team. However, the Eagles made little improvement from the following season as they finished the regular season in 7th place. In 2021 it was announced James would retire from the game at the end of the season.

International
In 2007 James was given some extra games and made 12 appearances and ended 2007 with a call up to the Wales team for the 2008 World Cup qualifiers. He was named in the Wales squad to face England at the Keepmoat Stadium, Doncaster, prior to England's departure for the 2008 Rugby League World Cup, but had to withdraw through injury.

References

External links
Sheffield Eagles profile
Harlequins sign Matt James from Bradford at londonbroncosrl.com
Profile at bradfordbulls.co.uk
Meet Matt James at londonbroncosrl.com
Raiders sign former Harlequins prop Matt James 
Gareth Thomas targets fitness for Wales' autumn Tests

1987 births
Living people
Barrow Raiders players
Bradford Bulls players
English people of Welsh descent
English rugby league players
Featherstone Rovers players
Halifax R.L.F.C. players
London Broncos players
Rugby league locks
Rugby league players from Wakefield
Rugby league props
Rugby league second-rows
Sheffield Eagles captains
Sheffield Eagles players
Wakefield Trinity players
Wales national rugby league team players